Susan Carol Stokes (born 1959) is an American political scientist and the Tiffany and Margaret Blake Distinguished Service Professor in the Political Science department of the University of Chicago, and the faculty director of the Chicago Center on Democracy. Her academic focus is on Latin American politics, comparative politics, and how democracies function in developing countries. Stokes is a member of the American Academy of Arts and Sciences. She was elected a member of the National Academy of Sciences in 2022.

Education and career
Stokes studied anthropology for her bachelor's degree at Harvard-Radcliffe and master's degree at Stanford University. She received her PhD in political science from Stanford in 1988. Since then, she has held academic appointments at the University of Washington (1988–91), the University of Chicago (1991-2005; 2018–present), and Yale University (2005–18, including serving as the John S. Saden Professor and Chair of the Political Science Department 2009–14). Stokes’ work has been supported by research grants and fellowships from the National Science Foundation (1997–99, 2003–05), the Guggenheim Memorial Foundation (2003–04), the MacArthur Foundation (1990–94), the Fulbright Program (1981–82, 1985–86), the American Philosophical Society (1999-2000), and the Russell Sage Foundation (2014-15). She teaches courses on political development, political parties and democracy, comparative political behavior, and distributive politics.

Family
Stokes is married to Steven Pincus and has three sons (David, Andrew, and Sam).

Organizations

Bright Line Watch 
In 2016, Stokes co-founded Bright Line Watch, an initiative to monitor the strength of U.S. democracy, The initiative conducts ongoing sets of surveys of political scientists and the general public in the United States to assess views of U.S. democratic performance.

Chicago Center on Democracy 
Stokes founded the Chicago Center on Democracy—based at the University of Chicago—in 2018, and serves as its faculty director. The center's focus is on research, public engagement, and building tools to expand public understanding of how democracies function.

Publications

Recent academic articles in refereed journals 

 "Searching for a Bright Line in the Trump Presidency," with John Carey, Gretchen Helmke, Brendan Nyhan, and Mitch Sanders. Perspectives on Politics, forthcoming.
 "Accountability for Realists." Critical Review 30(1-2):130-138, 2018.
 "Beyond Opportunity Costs: Campaign Messages, Anger, and Turnout Among the Unemployed," with Erdem Aytaç and Eli Rau, British Journal of Political Science, 1-15. doi:10.1017/S0007123418000248, 2018.
 "When do the Wealthy Support Redistribution? Inequality Aversion in Buenos Aires," with Germán Feierherd and Luis Schiumerini, British Journal of Political Science, 1-13, doi:10.1017/S0007123417000588, 2018.
 "Why do People Join Backlash Movements? Lesson from Turkey," with Erdem Aytaç and Luis Schiumerini, Journal of Conflict Resolution, 62(6):1205-1228, January, 2017.
 "Protests and Repression in New Democracies," with Erdem Aytaç and Luis Schiumerini, Perspectives on Politics, Vol. 15, Issue 1, March 2017.

Books 

 Stokes, Susan C.; Aytaç, S. Erdem (2019-01-31). Why Bother?: Rethinking Participation in Elections and Protests. Cambridge University Press, Cambridge (UK).
 Stokes, Susan C.; Dunning, Thad; Nazareno, Marcelo; Brusco, Valeria (2013-09-30). Brokers, Voters, and Clientelism: The Puzzle of Distributive Politics. Cambridge University Press, New York.  (hardback),  (paperback).
 Shapiro, Ian; Stokes, Susan C.; Wood, Elizabeth Jean; Kirshner, Alexander S. (2010-01-14). Political Representation. Cambridge University Press, Cambridge (UK).  (hardback) and 978-0-521-12865-0 (paperback).
 Levi, Margaret; Johnson, James; Knight, Jack; Stokes, Susan (2008-09-04). Designing Democratic Government: Making Institutions Work. Russell Sage Foundation, New York. .
 Boix, Carles; Stokes, Susan Carol (2007). The Oxford Handbook of Comparative Politics. Oxford University Press, Oxford (UK). .
 Cleary, Matthew R.; Stokes, Susan (2006-01-12). Democracy and the Culture of Skepticism: The Politics of Trust in Argentina and Mexico. Russell Sage Foundation, New York. .
 Stokes, Susan C. (2001-08-03). Mandates and Democracy: Neoliberalism by Surprise in Latin America. Cambridge University Press, Cambridge (UK).
 Stokes, Susan C. (1995-05-01). Cultures in Conflict: Social Movements and the State in Peru. University of California Press, Berkeley, Cal. .
 Przeworski, Adam; Stokes, Susan C.; Manin, Bernard (1999-09-13). Democracy, Accountability, and Representation. Cambridge University Press, Cambridge (UK).  (hardback) and 0-521-64616-2 (paperback).
 Stokes, Susan C. (2001-09-17). Public Support for Market Reforms in New Democracies.  Cambridge University Press, Cambridge (UK). .

References

External links
 Susan Stokes profile at University of Chicago

Living people
1959 births
American women political scientists
American political scientists
University of Chicago faculty
Stanford University faculty
Yale University faculty
MacArthur Fellows
Stanford University alumni
Radcliffe College alumni
American women academics
21st-century American women
Members of the United States National Academy of Sciences